Xi'an Palace was the palace of the Sui Dynasty and built under the order of the Emperor in 582. The palace was contained in the Imperial City of Daxing.

A copy of the outline of the right hand of Yang Guifei was carved on a large stone at the site, and still exists.

References

Palaces in China
Royal residences in China
History of Xi'an
Buildings and structures in Xi'an